was a Japanese mountaineer and entrepreneur.

Early life
Kuriki was born in Imakane, Setana District, Hokkaido, Japan. He graduated from Hokkaido Hiyama Kita High School and Sapporo International University's Humanities and Sociology Department of Sociology.

Mountain climbing

Kuriki climbed the Himalayas at high altitude once or twice a year. He successfully climbed the 8000 meter peaks Cho Oyu in August 2007 and Dhaulagiri in May 2009. He tried to climb Mount Everest without oxygen while live streaming over the internet, climbing the Tibet side in September 2009, and the Nepal side in September 2010, but was not able to climb above 8,000 meters. In his third time climbing the Nepal side in August to October 2011, Kuriki was not able to reach 7,900 meters. During his fourth attempt in October 2012, he gave up due to the strong wind, and lost nine of his fingers to frostbite after spending two days in a snow hole at temperatures below -20 °C. His 2015 attempt was prevented by the avalanche that struck Everest Base Camp that year, and his attempts in 2016 and 2017 were cut short by weather conditions.

Kuriki advertised his climbing style as "solo without oxygen". However, Kuriki's style was not recognized as "solo without oxygen" by the mountaineering community. He was actually supported by Sherpas and sometimes secretly used oxygen bottles.

He gave well-attended lectures across Japan on the theme of "shared adventure" and the value of perseverance, and attracted numerous social media followers with his online postings, including videos and photos of his climbs.

Kuriki successfully climbed the highest peaks of six continents (the Seven Summits) during his career, including Denali, Aconcagua, Mount Elbrus, Mount Kilimanjaro, the Carstensz Pyramid, and Mount Vinson.

He was represented by the talent agency, Yoshimoto Creative Agency.

Death

In May 2018, during his 8th attempt to climb Mount Everest, he died while descending from Camp Three after abandoning the attempt due to illness. He is survived by his father Toshio.

Filmography

TV series

Books

Music

See also
List of people who died climbing Mount Everest

References

External links
 
 

1982 births
2018 deaths
Japanese mountain climbers
Mountaineering deaths on Mount Everest
People from Hokkaido